Atanas Chipilov (born 2 June 1987) is a Bulgarian footballer who plays as a winger for Vihren Sandanski.

Career

Youth career
Chipilov started training his abilities at Levski Sofia's Youth Academy. He joined Dynamo Kyiv's youth side in 2004.

Dynamo Kyiv
Chipilov joined Dynamo's second team in 2004 and played in the Ukrainian First League for a few seasons. He was loaned to Bulgarian sides Botev Plovdiv and Chernomorets Burgas during 2007 and 2008. In 2009, Chipilov returned Dynamo Kyiv, where he played for the second team of Dynamo Kyiv. He capped 12 times and scored 4 goals.

On 19 June 2009 Chipilov began a trial-period at his former club Levski Sofia. Anyway, his abilities didn't impress the coaching staff, and eventually he didn't join the team.

Bansko
In January 2017, Chipilov joined Bansko for the third time.

Arda Kardzhali
On 1 July 2017 he signed with Arda Kardzhali.

External links

 Chipilov at Dynamo's site

References

1987 births
Living people
Bulgarian footballers
Bulgarian expatriate footballers
Expatriate footballers in Ukraine
FC Dynamo Kyiv players
PFC Chernomorets Burgas players
Botev Plovdiv players
FC Montana players
PFC Beroe Stara Zagora players
PFC Slavia Sofia players
FC Haskovo players
OFC Pirin Blagoevgrad players
FC Bansko players
Neftochimic Burgas players
FC Arda Kardzhali players
OFC Vihren Sandanski players
First Professional Football League (Bulgaria) players
Association football midfielders
People from Sandanski
Sportspeople from Blagoevgrad Province